Société Omnisports de l'Armée, commonly known as SOA, is an Ivorian football club based in Yamoussoukro. The club is a member of the Ivorian Football Federation Premiere Division. They play at Stade de Yamoussoukro.

Current squad

Honours
Côte d'Ivoire Premier Division
Champions: 2018–19

Côte d'Ivoire Cup
Winners: 1996
Runners-up: 2006

Coupe de la Ligue de Côte d'Ivoire
Winners: 2014

Félix Houphouët-Boigny Cup
Winners: 1996, 2019

Performance in CAF competitions
CAF Champions League: 1 appearance
2020 – Preliminary Round

CAF Confederation Cup: 1 appearance
2009 – First Round

CAF Cup Winners' Cup: 4 appearances
1997 – quarter-finals

CAF Super Cup: 0 appearance

Miscellaneous
On 19.June 1994, SO Armee played 2:1 in the Ivorian league against ASEC, thus ending ASEC′s world record unbeaten streak of 108 league and domestic cup games between 1989 and 1994.

References

External links
 Official site

Football clubs in Ivory Coast
1932 establishments in Ivory Coast
Sports clubs in Ivory Coast
Sport in Yamoussoukro
Association football clubs established in 1932
Military association football clubs